This article is a list of every person who has served as an on-camera announcer for the NFL on Fox:

List of current announcers

A
Kenny Albert: play-by-play (1994–present)
Erin Andrews: sideline reporter and Fox NFL Sunday feature reporter (2012–present); lead Sunday sideline reporter (2014–2020); Thursday Night Football co-lead sideline reporter (2018–2021); co-lead Sunday sideline reporter (2021–present)
Adam Amin: play-by-play (2020–present)

B
Jason Benetti: play-by-play (2022–present)
Dean Blandino: rules analyst (2017–present)
Tom Brady: lead color commentator (to begin in 2024)
Terry Bradshaw: studio co-host (1994–present); TNF studio analyst (2018–2021); rotating analyst (2019–2021)
Kevin Burkhardt: play-by-play (2013–present); #2 (2014–2021); lead play-by-play (2022–present)

C
Lindsay Czarniak: rotating sideline reporter (2019, 2022-present); full-time sideline reporter (2020–2021)

D
Joe Davis: rotating play-by-play (2015–2021), #2 play-by-play (2022–present)

E
Noah Eagle: rotating play-by-play (2022)

G
Jay Glazer: Fox NFL insider (2007–present)/Thursday Night Football insider (2018); sideline reporter (2004–2006)

H
 Jen Hale: full-time sideline reporter (2020–present); rotating sideline reporter (2011–2019)
 Dan Hellie: rotating play-by-play (2017-present)

J
Jimmy Johnson: studio analyst (1994–95 and 2002–present)
Daryl Johnston: analyst (2001–present; #2 2001–2012, 2020 and 2022–present)

K
Kevin Kugler: play-by-play (2020–present)

L
Howie Long: studio analyst (1994–present)/Thursday Night Football studio analyst (2018–2021); rotating analyst (2019–2021)

M
Curt Menefee: studio host (2007–present); part-time studio host (2006); play-by-play (1998–2005); part–time play-by-play (2006); New York sideline reporter (1997–98); NFL Network Special play-by-play (2018); Thursday Night Football studio host (2020–2021)
Matt Millen: analyst (1994–2000, 2015–present)
Chris Myers: postseason sideline reporter, regular season play-by-play (2003–present); fill-in studio host (2020)

O
Laura Okmin: sideline reporter (2006–present)
Pam Oliver: sideline reporter (1995–present)
Megan Olivi: sideline reporter (2018-present)
Greg Olsen: analyst (2021–present; #2 2021; #1 analyst 2022–present)

P
Mike Pereira: rules analyst (2010–present); Thursday Night Football rules analyst (2018–2021)
Kristina Pink: sideline reporter (2012–present); TNF co-lead sideline reporter (2018–2021)

R
Tom Rinaldi: co-lead Sunday sideline reporter (2021–present)

S
Mark Sanchez: analyst (2021–present)
Mark Schlereth: analyst (2017–present)
Peter Schrager: studio analyst (2016–present)/Thursday Night Football insider (2019–2021)
Robert Smith: analyst (2018–2019, 2022–present)
Shannon Spake: sideline reporter (2016–present)
Michael Strahan: studio analyst (2008–present); Thursday Night Football studio host (2018–2019); Thursday Night Football contributor (2020–2021)

T
Charissa Thompson: Fox NFL Kickoff co-host (2007–2010, 2014–present)

V
Jonathan Vilma: analyst (2020–present)

W
Sara Walsh: sideline reporter (2018–present)

2022 broadcaster pairings
 Kevin Burkhardt/Greg Olsen/Erin Andrews/Tom Rinaldi
 Joe Davis, Brandon Gaudin (week 6) or Adam Amin (weeks 7–9)/Daryl Johnston/Pam Oliver
 Adam Amin, Noah Eagle (week 6) or Chris Myers (weeks 7–9)/Mark Schlereth/Kristina Pink
 Kenny Albert/Jonathan Vilma/Shannon Spake
 Kevin Kugler/Mark Sanchez/Laura Okmin
 Chris Myers or Brandon Gaudin (weeks 7–8)/Robert Smith/Jen Hale
 Brandon Gaudin (weeks 3, 5) or Jason Benetti (weeks 17–18)/Brady Quinn (weeks 3, 17) or Matt Millen (weeks 5, 18)/Megan Olivi
 Dan Hellie/Matt Millen/Lindsay Czarniak

Former

A
Troy Aikman: analyst (2001–2021; #1 analyst, 2002-2021); Thursday Night Football main analyst (2018–2021)
Marcus Allen: analyst (1994)
Barry Alvarez: analyst (2006)

B
Brian Baldinger: analyst (1998–2008)
Ronde Barber: analyst (2013–2019)
Brian Billick: analyst (2008–13)
Carter Blackburn: play-by-play (2005)
Tony Boselli: analyst (2007–08)
Mike Breen: play-by-play (1994–96)
Thom Brennaman: play-by-play (1994–97, 1999–2000, 2004–19)
Tim Brewster: sideline reporter (2011)
James Brown: studio host (1994–2005)
Steve Byrnes: play-by-play (2006)
Joe Buck: play-by-play (regional play-by-play 1994–97, 2001; #1 play-by-play, 2002–2021); studio host: (2006); Thursday Night Football main play-by-play (2018–2021)

C
Scott Case: analyst (1996)
Rich Cellini: sideline reporter (2003)
Eric Clemons: play-by-play (1994–97); New Orleans sideline reporter (2004)
Cris Collinsworth: studio analyst (1998–2002) analyst (2002–04)

D
Charles Davis: analyst (2006, 2009–2019)
Spero Dedes: play-by-play (2004)
Terry Donahue: analyst (2005–07)
David Diehl: analyst (2014–2017)

G
Jason Garrett: analyst (2004)
Jerry Glanville: analyst (1994–98)
Mike Goldberg play-by-play (2014)
Tony Gonzalez: studio analyst (2017–2020); TNF analyst (part-time 2018; full-time 2019–2020)
Drew Goodman: play-by-play (2000–2002)
Scott Graham: play-by-play (1999–2003)
Tim Green: analyst (1994–2005)
Trent Green: analyst (2009)
Howard Griffith: analyst (2005)

H
Kevin Harlan: play-by-play (1994–97)
Tim Hasselbeck: analyst (2007)

J
Greg Jennings: analyst (full time 2020; part-time 2018–2019)
D. J. Johnson: sideline reporter (1999–2000); analyst (2001)
Gus Johnson: rotating play-by-play (2011–2013, 2021)
Sean Jones: analyst (2001–02)
John Jurkovic: analyst (2001)

K
Paul Kennedy: play-by-play (1997, 2001)
Brian Kilmeade: New York sideline reporter (2003)
Erik Kramer: analyst (2004–05)

L
Josh Lewin: play-by-play (2006)
John Lynch: analyst (2008–2016)

M
John Madden: analyst (1994–2001)
Dan McLaughlin: St. Louis sideline reporter (2005); play-by-play (2006)
Donovan McNabb: analyst (2014)
Jim L. Mora: analyst (2010–11)
Kirk Morrison: analyst (2014–2015)

N
Karl Nelson: analyst (1995)

O
Patrick O'Neal: sideline reporter (2005); co-studio host (2012)

P
Jesse Palmer: analyst (2005–06)
Dave Pasch: play-by-play (2003)
J. C. Pearson: analyst (2003–08)
Ron Pitts: play-by-play (2002–12), analyst (1994–2000), sideline reporter (1999–2001)

R
Andre Reed: analyst (2003)
Bill Romanowski: analyst (2003)
Chris Rose: in-game highlights (2006), play-by-play (2005, 2007–11)
Tim Ryan: play-by-play (1998)
Tim Ryan: analyst (2002–13), sideline reporter (2001)
Sam Rosen: play-by-play (1996–2019)

S
Tony Siragusa: sideline reporter/analyst (2003–2015)
Pat Summerall: play-by-play (#1 from 1994–2001, 2002, 2006–07)
Chris Spielman: analyst (2016–2020)
Dick Stockton: play-by-play (1994–2020)

T
Aqib Talib: analyst (2020–2021)
Amber Theoharis: sideline reporter (2007)
Ross Tucker: analyst (2009)
Nischelle Turner: sideline reporter (2007–2010)

V
Matt Vasgersian: play-by-play (2005–08)                           
Krista Voda: sideline reporter (2006–2008, 2012–2013)

W
Dave Wannstedt: analyst (2004)

A-team intradivisional breakdown

1994-2001
Here are the 1994-2001 National Football Conference divisional games called by Pat Summerall and John Madden.

2002-2008
These are intradivisional the regular season games that Troy Aikman has called beginning in 2002. This is broken down by division, and only features matchups within the division. This does not include Thanksgiving games since those always get the top team.

Games during the baseball postseason (since 2002)
Here are the games that Troy Aikman (and Cris Collinsworth from 2002-04) did color when Joe Buck was calling postseason baseball. Buck also spent the last two weeks of the 2006 season in the Fox Sports studio in Los Angeles. The play-by-play announcers who substituted for Buck are in parenthesis.

References

External links
 FOX NFL Announcer History

Fox commentator
NFL on Fox commentator